John Owoeri (born 13 January 1987) is a Nigerian professional footballer who plays as a striker for Finnish club Mariehamn.

Club career
Owoeri was born in Warri. He has played for NPA, Bendel Insurance FC, Feyenoord,  K.V.C. Westerlo and Enyimba of Aba. He played in 2009 with Heartland F.C. and scored two goals in their 10–1 thrashing of Monrovia Black Stars in the 2009 Champions League opening round. On 29 November 2009, he announced to sign with Warri Wolves F.C., but nothing came of it. He joined Ismaily ahead of the 2010–11 season after two seasons with Heartland. In August 2012, the striker left Egyptian Premier League club Ismaily SC to sign for Nigerian side Sunshine Stars F.C. He played three months with the Akure club, before transferred to Warri Wolves F.C. on 2 November 2012.

On 7 April 2022, Owoeri signed with Mariehamn in Finland.

International career
In 2005, he scored a goal for Nigeria in the FIFA World Youth Championship. Owoeri has played one match for the Super Eagles for the Cup of Nations qualifier against Guinea.

Honours 
Individual
 Allsvenskan top scorer: 2016

References

External links

1987 births
Living people
Nigerian footballers
Nigeria international footballers
Nigeria under-20 international footballers
Belgian Pro League players
Feyenoord players
K.V.C. Westerlo players
Enyimba F.C. players
Nigerian expatriate footballers
Nigerian expatriate sportspeople in the Netherlands
Ismaily SC players
Expatriate footballers in the Netherlands
Sunshine Stars F.C. players
Nigerian expatriate sportspeople in Belgium
Bendel Insurance F.C. players
Expatriate footballers in Belgium
Heartland F.C. players
Expatriate footballers in Egypt
Nigerian expatriate sportspeople in Egypt
Warri Wolves F.C. players
Åtvidabergs FF players
BK Häcken players
Baoding Yingli Yitong players
Shanghai Shenxin F.C. players
Inner Mongolia Zhongyou F.C. players
Shaanxi Chang'an Athletic F.C. players
Beijing Sport University F.C. players
IFK Mariehamn players
Allsvenskan players
Expatriate footballers in Sweden
Nigerian expatriate sportspeople in Sweden
China League One players
Expatriate footballers in China
Nigerian expatriate sportspeople in China
Expatriate footballers in Finland
Nigerian expatriate sportspeople in Finland
Association football forwards
Egyptian Premier League players
Sportspeople from Warri